Bolton Abbey is a village and civil parish in the Craven district of North Yorkshire, England,  north-west of Leeds. The village lies in Wharfedale, near the southern edge of the Yorkshire Dales National Park, and just north of the border with West Yorkshire.

The village takes its name from the monastery now generally known as Bolton Priory, and is adjacent to the Bolton Abbey Estate, which includes the priory ruins and extends beyond the parish.  The church of Bolton Priory is now the parish church of Bolton Abbey.

The parish had a population of 111 in the 2011 census.

References

External links 

Villages in North Yorkshire
Civil parishes in North Yorkshire
Craven District
Wharfedale